Constanța is a county (județ) of Romania on the border with Bulgaria, in the Dobruja region.  Its capital city is also named Constanța.

Demographics 

In 2011, it had a population of 684,082 and the population density was 96/km2. The degree of urbanization is much higher (about 75%) than the Romanian average. In recent years the population trend is:

The majority of the population are Romanians. There are important communities of Turks and Tatars, remnants of the time of Ottoman rule. Currently the region is the centre of the Muslim minority in Romania. A great number of Aromanians have migrated to Dobruja in the last century, and they consider themselves a cultural minority rather than an ethnic minority. There are also Romani.

Geography
Călărași County and Ialomița County are to the west.
Tulcea County and Brăila County are to the north.
Bulgaria (Dobrich Province and Silistra Province) are to the south.

Economy

The predominant industries in the county are:
 Tourism
 Chemicals and petrochemicals
 Food and beverages
 Textiles
 Shipbuilding
 Construction materials
 Mechanical components
 Paper

Agriculture is an important part in the county's economy, with Constanța being the county with the largest irrigation systems in the country (more than 4,300 km2 before 1989, now greatly reduced), cereals being the most important products. Also, the county is famous for its wines from the Murfatlar region.

At Cernavodă there is a nuclear power plant with two reactors, each of the CANDU type of Canadian design. The plant covers over 15% of the country's power demand.

The Port of Constanța is the largest port in Romania, the most important of the Black Sea and the 4th in Europe. It is linked with the Danube by the Danube-Black Sea Canal – the widest and deepest navigable channel in Europe, although it is not used to its full potential.

Tourism
The Romanian Riviera along the coast of the Black Sea is the preferred destination for the summer holidays in Romania. The resorts are, from North to South:
 Năvodari
 Mamaia
 Eforie (North and South)
 Costinești
 Olimp
 Neptun
 Jupiter
 Cap Aurora
 Venus
 Saturn
 Mangalia
 2 Mai
 Vama Veche

Also worth visiting are:
 The city of Constanța
 The mausoleum at Adamclisi
 The Portița area

Politics 

As of 27 September 2020, the elected President of the County Council is Mihai Lupu from PNL. In addition, in the wake of the 2020 Romanian local elections, the current Constanța County Council consists of 36 counsellors, with the following party composition:

Administrative divisions

Constanța County has 3 municipalities, 9 towns and 58 communes:
Municipalities
Constanța – capital city; population: 283,872 (as of 2011)
Mangalia
Medgidia

Towns
Cernavodă
Eforie
Hârșova
Murfatlar
Năvodari
Negru Vodă
Ovidiu
Techirghiol

Communes
23 August
Adamclisi
Agigea
Albești
Aliman
Amzacea
Băneasa (town between 2004 and 2019)
Bărăganu
Castelu
Cerchezu
Chirnogeni
Ciobanu
Ciocârlia
Cobadin
Cogealac
Comana
Corbu
Costinești
Crucea
Cumpăna
Cuza Vodă
Deleni
Dobromir
Dumbrăveni
Fântânele
Gârliciu
Ghindărești
Grădina
Horia
Independența
Ion Corvin
Istria
Limanu
Lipnița
Lumina
Mereni
Mihai Viteazu
Mihail Kogălniceanu
Mircea Vodă
Nicolae Bălcescu
Oltina
Ostrov
Pantelimon
Pecineaga
Peștera
Poarta Albă
Rasova
Saligny
Saraiu
Săcele
Seimeni
Siliștea
Târguşor
Topalu
Topraisar
Tortoman
Tuzla
Valu lui Traian
Vulturu

Historical county

Following the 1926 administrative reform, the borders of the historical county are identical to the ones of the current Constanța County, with the exception of the Ostrov and Lipnița communes, which were then administered by the Durostor County, the Baia commune, now part of Tulcea County, and the villages of Tereskondu, Pârâul Caprei, Fundeni, Pădureni, Saldu Alde and Enigea-Haidar, now in Bulgaria.

Geography

The county neighboured the Black Sea to the east, the counties of Tulcea and Brăila to the north, Ialomița to the west, Durostor to the south-west and Caliacra to the south.

Administration
The county originally consisted of four districts (plăși):
Plasa Dunărea
Plasa Mangalia
Plasa Ovidiu
Plasa Traian

Subsequently, the territory of the county was reorganized into seven districts:
Plasa Cernavodă, headquartered in Cernavodă
Plasa Dunărea, headquartered in Hârșova
Plasa Ferdinand, headquartered in Constanța
Plasa Mangalia, headquartered in Mangalia
Plasa Negru-Vodă, headquartered in Negru Vodă
Plasa Traian, headquartered in Ion Corvin
Plasa Medgidia, headquartered in Medgidia

On the territory of Constanta County there were seven urban localities: Constanţa (with city status) and the urban communes of Carmen-Sylva, Techirghiol, Mangalia, Medgidia, Cernavodă and Hârșova.

After 1938
After the 1938 Administrative and Constitutional Reform, this county merged with the counties of Ialomița, Durostor and Caliacra to form Ținutul Mării. It was re-established in 1940 after the fall of Carol II's regime. Ten years later, it was abolished by the Communist regime.

Population 
According to the census data of 1930, the county's population was 253,093 inhabitants, of which 66.2% were Romanians, 8.9% Bulgarians, 6.8% Turks, 6.0% Tatars, 3.8% Germans, 1.8% Greeks, 1.5% Russians, 1.3% Armenians, as well as other minorities. In religion, the population consisted of 78.9% Eastern Orthodox, 13.1% Islam, 2.5% Lutheran, 1.8% Roman Catholics, as well as other minorities.

Urban population 

In 1930, the urban population of the county was 81,631 inhabitants, 68.7% Romanians, 7.3% Turks, 5.2% Greeks, 3.9% Armenians, 2.5% Germans, 2.2% Jews, 2.0% Tatars, 2.0% Bulgarians, 1.7% Russians, 1.7% Hungarians, as well as other minorities. Among the urban population, mother tongues were reported to be Romanian (72.0%), Turkish (9.7%), Greek (4.5%), Armenian (3.6%), German (2.4%), as well as other minorities. From the religious point of view, the urban population was composed mostly of Eastern Orthodox (78.4%), followed by Muslim (9.6%), Armenian Apostolic (3.3%), Roman Catholic (2.7%), Jewish (2.3%), Lutheran (1.6%), as well as other minorities.

References

External links
  memoria.ro, Interwar Constanța County

 
Counties of Romania
1879 establishments in Romania
1938 disestablishments in Romania
1940 establishments in Romania
1950 disestablishments in Romania
1968 establishments in Romania
States and territories established in 1879
States and territories disestablished in 1938
States and territories established in 1940
States and territories disestablished in 1950
States and territories established in 1968